Alan Bullard (born 4 August 1947) is a British composer, known mainly for his choral and educational music. His compositions are regularly performed and broadcast worldwide, and they appear on a number of CDs.

Early career and education

He was born in Norwood, South London on 4 August 1947, son of artists Paul Bullard and Jeanne Bullard, and lived as a child in Blackheath, South-East London. He attended St. Olave's Grammar School, where he learnt music with Desmond Swinburn, while studying piano with Geoffrey Flowers and John Allen at the Blackheath Conservatoire of Music. He then studied with Herbert Howells, Ruth Gipps and Antony Hopkins at the Royal College of Music, and took postgraduate study with Arnold Whittall at the University of Nottingham. For the next few years he taught music part-time in several art schools and at the London College of Music (from 1970 to 1975).

Apart from a short song written in 1967 when he was a student of Herbert Howells, the earliest work that Alan Bullard now acknowledges is his Three Poems of W B Yeats of 1973. This work, and a cluster of other choral works, (several of which found publishers such as Banks and the RSCM) written at about the same time, are almost the only pieces to survive this period.

Professional career

The opportunity of a permanent teaching post at what is now Colchester Institute (where Bullard taught from 1975 to 2005) caused a move to the Essex countryside, and later to Colchester. Here encouragement by several colleagues and friends resulted in a growing musical confidence and output: for example Colchester Choral Society (director Ian Ray) commissioned three large-scale works for choir and orchestra.

In 1985 Bullard wrote a setting for unaccompanied choir of four sixteenth-century poems entitled Madrigal Book. This work came to the attention of Stephen Wilkinson and was the beginning of a long association with Alan Bullard's choral music, resulting in several broadcasts by the BBC Northern Singers.

Meanwhile, his work in the area of choral music for amateurs attracted the interest of Oxford University Press, and there is now in their catalogue  a wide variety of Bullard’s anthems and carols for different choral groupings and situations, many of which are performed worldwide.

Many of Bullard’s orchestral pieces found first performances in East Anglia, often under the baton of Christopher Phelps. Bullard has also written much chamber music for many instrumental combinations and his music for wind groups, in particular, has found particular favour, as has his music for the recorder, an instrument he enjoys playing as an amateur.

Bullard has also written much music for children and adult learners: he is a contributor to many instrumental collections and is the composer of Joining the Dots (ABRSM)  an ongoing series to develop musical sight-reading, and the editor and author, with his wife Janet, of the Pianoworks piano tutor series  published by Oxford University Press. Bullard claims to find ‘the writing of an interesting Grade One piece as exciting as any other musical challenge’.

Awards

In 2008 Bullard was awarded an Honorary Doctorate by the University of Essex for his work in composition and education, and in 2010 he received three awards from the Music Industries Association (MIA) for his publications in that year.

Musical language and reception

Bullard acknowledges the influence of twentieth-century composers such as Benjamin Britten and Herbert Howells on his musical language, as well as that of mediaeval and renaissance music. Writers have described his music as ‘gentle, melodic, and unfailingly well-crafted’,  and showing ‘a real sense of pianistic understanding, economical and linear without sounding clichéd’. Another critic has said ‘Bullard’s music shows a genuine love for melodic contours and a delicate shading of a harmonic language that is respectful of tradition without being a slave to it’. Of his Christmas carols, writers have said that ‘Bullard’s direct tuneful language draws its chief source of inspiration from the eloquent simplicity of folk-carols’  and that ‘he shows a sensitivity to the text, and vocal lines that show a natural easy flow’ and found his carol ‘Glory to the Christ-Child’ to be a ‘rigorous and exhilarating setting of mediaeval lyrics’. And educational material such as Pianoworks (with his wife Janet as co-writer) has been welcomed as ‘attractive, unpatronising and adult in manner’.

Bullard's is not ivory tower music - what seems to please him most is to write music which performers enjoy playing and audiences enjoy hearing: music which might provide something of a challenge, but which is not out of reach. As one critic put it: ‘He sees his role as quietly getting on with the vocation of writing music that people will want to sing and play on the everyday, as well as the special occasion’.

Personal life

Alan Bullard is married to Janet Bullard (nee Dakin), a piano teacher and singer. They live in Colchester, Essex and Friston, Suffolk, and they have two children and two grandchildren.

Main publishers

ABRSM
Oxford University Press
Spartan Press
Forsyth Brothers Ltd

Selected list of compositions

Choral
Dance of the Universe (1979)
Madrigal Book (1985) 
Canticle of Freedom (1999)
A Summer Garland (2002)
A Feast for Christmas (2007)
Pictures of Night (2008)
Dover Te Deum (2009)
Wondrous Cross (2011)
Magnficat and Nunc Dimittis (Selwyn Service) (2012)
O Come, Emmanuel (2013)
A Light in the Stable (2014)
Psalmi Penitentiales (2016)
Images of Peace (2018)

Collections
Alan Bullard Anthems
Alan Bullard Carols
The Oxford Book of Flexible Anthems
The Oxford Book of Flexible Carols
The Oxford Book of Easy Flexible Anthems
The Oxford Book of Flexible Choral Songs

Vocal

The Sea of Faith (1995)
The Solitary Reaper (1995)
A Swan, a Man (2009)

Instrumental

Dances for Wind Quintet (1982)
Three Diversions for descant or tenor recorder and piano or harpsichord (1983 Forsyth)
Overtones – clarinet quartet (1985)
String Quartet no. 1 (1989)
Recipes for descant recorder and optional piano or guitar, or string orchestra/quartet (1989 Forsyth)
Attitudes – solo guitar (1991)
Olympian Sketches – clarinet quartet (1993)
Three Picasso Portraits – saxophone quartet (1992)
Galloway Sketches - homage to Walter Carroll for recorder (treble doubling descant and optional garklein) and piano or guitar (1995 Forsyth)
Spring Pictures – violin and piano (1996)
Winter Variations – cello and piano (1998)
Cyclic Harmony – clarinet or saxophone choir (1998)
Hat Box for recorder and piano or guitar (2003 Forsyth)
Large White Rock – chamber ensemble (2004)
String Quartet no. 2 (2006)
North Sea Sketches – recorder ensemble (2010)
Journey through Time – woodwind orchestra (2010)

Orchestral

Fanfares for orchestra (1985)
Sinfonietta for brass, percussion and strings (1987)
Aztec Genesis – full orchestra (2000)
Recorder Concerto (2010)
Hark to the Bells (2012)

Educational
Fifty for Flute (1995)
Lunar Landscapes for cello (1995)
World Atlas for piano (1996)
Sixty for Sax (2005)

Series
Party Time (1996-8)
Circus Skills (2001–2)
Pianoworks (2007–)
Joining the Dots (2010–)

Selected list of choirs, performers, and conductors of Bullard’s music

Selected choirs

BBC Northern Singers
BBC Singers
Chapel Choir of Selwyn College Cambridge
Choir of Christ Church Cathedral, Montreal
Choir of Coventry Cathedral
Choir of Ely Cathedral
Choir of Kings College Cambridge
Choir of St John’s College Cambridge
Colchester Choral Society
Elysian Singers
Fairhaven Singers
Ionian Singers
Joyful Company of Singers
Reading Phoenix Choir
St Michael’s Singers
The Allegri Singers
The Sixteen
Vasari Singers
VocalEssence, Minneapolis
Waltham Singers
William Byrd Singers of Manchester
Wooburn Singers

Selected performers

Anna Tillbrook
Beth Spendlove
Christian Forshaw
Colin Baldy
Daniel Grimwood
Huw Watkins
Ian Mitchell
James Oxley
Jamie Walton
Joby Burgess
John Turner
Lindsay Gowers
Nigel Clayton
Maria Jette
Nancy Ruffer
Sarah Burnett
Sarah Leonard
Sarah Watts
Susie Allan
William Coleman

Selected orchestras and ensembles

Bloomsbury Woodwind Ensemble
Bournemouth Symphony Orchestra
British Clarinet Ensemble
Chinook Clarinet Quartet
Composers Ensemble
Ebony Quartet
Farnaby Brass
Gemini
Georgian String Quartet
Langdon Chamber Players
Quince String Quartet
Royal Ballet Sinfonia
Saxology

Selected conductors

Aidan Oliver
Andrew Massey
Andrew Nethsinga
Bob Chilcott
Charles Hine
Christopher Phelps
Elgar Howarth
Geoff Harniess
Graham Ross
Gwyn Arch
Harry Christophers
Ian Ray
Jeremy Backhouse
John Wallace
Michael Finnissy
Michael Nicholas
Paul Leddington Wright
Philip Brunelle
Roderick Earle
Sarah MacDonald
Shea Lolin
Stephen Cleobury
Stephen Wilkinson
Ralph Woodward
Timothy Salter

References

External links
Official Alan Bullard website
Choral Connections
Alan Bullard biography

1947 births
Living people
British composers
British music educators
People from London